FC Servis-Kholod-Smena Moscow was a Russian football team from Moscow. It played professionally in 1995 and 1996. Their best result was 19th place in the Zone 3 of the Russian Third League in 1996.

Team name history
 1994 FC Smena-Ronika Moscow
 1995–1996 FC Smena Moscow
 1997 FC Smena-Servis Kholod Moscow
 1998 FC Serkhol-Smena Moscow
 1999 FC Servis-Kholod Moscow
 2000 FC Servis-Kholod-Smena Moscow

External links
  Team history at KLISF

Association football clubs established in 1994
Association football clubs disestablished in 2001
Defunct football clubs in Moscow
1994 establishments in Russia
2001 disestablishments in Russia